Red and White Army is a term applied to sports teams that play in the colours red and white and is also ascribed to their respective supporters.

Teams that are known as the Red and White Army include:

In Football

Arsenal F.C.
AZ Alkmaar
Charlton Athletic F.C.
Derry City F.C.
Hemel Hempstead Town F.C.
Leigh RMI F.C.
Middlesbrough F.C.
Rotherham United F.C.
Southampton F.C.
Sunderland A.F.C.
Swindon Town F.C.
Stevenage F.C. 
In Australian rules football
Sydney Swans